= Hofstra Center for Teaching and Scholarly Excellence =

The Center for Teaching Excellence (CTE) at Hofstra University was established in 1990 to support the work of the Hofstra faculty. In 2002 it was renamed as the Center for Teaching and Scholarly Excellence to reflect a broader mission including researching and general faculty assistance. The primary purpose of the CTSE was to promote and encourage excellence in teaching, learning, research, publication, and other scholarly pursuits through a variety of academic activities. Specifically, it provided a formal mechanism to support non-funded research and other scholarly activities in a general manner across the entire Hofstra campus.

The CTSE was a resource for the Hofstra community. Some of the CTSE's initiatives and programs included:

- Review and recommendations for Special Teaching Leaves (sabbaticals);
- New faculty mentoring program;
- Workshops, symposia, presentations, and informal discussion sessions;
- Individual and group consultation;
- Serving as a resource for materials and methodology related to teaching and research;
- Acquainting faculty and administration with innovations and research related to teaching, learning and research;
- Facilitating the introduction, implementation and evaluation of instructional innovations;
- Facilitating joint research activities of Hofstra faculty members from disparate disciplines; and
- Providing blind and confidential peer review of finished manuscripts and works-in-progress by faculty members outside the writer's own department.

The Hofstra Center for Teaching and Scholarly Excellence was disbanded in 2012.
